Otta Wenskus (born 29 May 1955, in Marburg/Lahn) is a German Classical philologist currently residing in Austria.

Wenskus, daughter of historian Reinhard Wenskus, studied Classical philology and linguistics at the Universities of Göttingen, Florence, and Lausanne. She acquired her Ph.D. in Göttingen in 1982. In 1985/86 she was maître de conférences at the University of Caen, and in 1987 Visiting Scholar at the Institute of the History of Mathematics at Brown University, Providence, Rhode Island.

She passed her habilitation in 1988. During the summer terms of 1990 and 1992 she was a guest professor at the Universities of Osnabrück and Jena respectively and, from 1990 to 1994, a Heisenberg scholar until her appointment as a full professor at the University of Innsbruck.

Her topics include history of science, particularly medicine and astronomy, linguistics, particularly code switching, gender studies, Latin epistolography, Dante, and the reception of classical antiquity in fantasy and science fiction, particularly Star Trek.

Selected works 
 Ringkomposition, anaphorisch-rekapitulierende Verbindung und anknüpfende Wiederholung im hippokratischen Corpus, Frankfurt 1982 (doctoral dissertation, Göttingen 1982), .
 Astronomische Zeitangaben von Homer bis Theophrast. Hermes Einzelschriften 55, Stuttgart 1990 (habilitation thesis, Göttingen 1988), .
 Emblematischer Codewechsel und Verwandtes in der lateinischen Prosa. Zwischen Nähesprache und Distanzsprache, Innsbruck 1998, .
 Umwege in die Vergangenheit : Star Trek und die griechisch-römische Antike, Innsbruck 2009, .

External links 
 
 Otta Wenskus at the University of Innsbruck

German classical philologists
University of Göttingen alumni
University of Florence alumni
University of Lausanne alumni
Academic staff of the University of Innsbruck
People from Marburg
1955 births
Living people
Women philologists